Tore is a small village on the Black Isle, in Ross and Cromarty, Highland, Scotland.

Settlements
The Tore roundabout, a major roundabout where the A9 intersects the A832 and the A835, is next to the village. It is split up and therefore set around the roundabout. The school and hall are in their own area, whilst the service station is positioned on the other side. The residents' houses are spread over both halves of the village.

References

Populated places on the Black Isle